A lock-in amplifier is a type of amplifier that can extract a signal with a known carrier wave from an extremely noisy environment. Depending on the dynamic reserve of the instrument, signals up to a million times smaller than noise components, potentially fairly close by in frequency, can still be reliably detected. It is essentially a homodyne detector followed by low-pass filter that is often adjustable in cut-off frequency and filter order.

The device is often used to measure phase shift, even when the signals are large, have a high signal-to-noise ratio and do not need further improvement.

Recovering signals at low signal-to-noise ratios requires a strong, clean reference signal with the same frequency as the received signal. This is not the case in many experiments, so the instrument can recover signals buried in the noise only in a limited set of circumstances.

The lock-in amplifier is commonly believed to have been invented by Princeton University physicist Robert H. Dicke who founded the company Princeton Applied Research (PAR) to market the product. However, in an interview with Martin Harwit, Dicke claims that even though he is often credited with the invention of the device, he believes that he read about it in a review of scientific equipment written by Walter C. Michels, a professor at Bryn Mawr College. This could have been a 1941 article by Michels and Curtis, which in turn cites a 1934 article by C. R. Cosens, while another timeless article was written by C. A. Stutt in 1949.

Whereas traditional lock-in amplifiers use analog frequency mixers and RC filters for the demodulation, state-of-the-art instruments have both steps implemented by fast digital signal processing, for example, on an FPGA. Usually sine and cosine demodulation is performed simultaneously, which is sometimes also referred to as dual-phase demodulation. This allows the extraction of the in-phase and the quadrature component that can then be transferred into polar coordinates, i.e. amplitude and phase, or further processed as real and imaginary part of a complex number (e.g. for complex FFT analysis).

Basic principles 
The operation of a lock-in amplifier relies on the orthogonality of sinusoidal functions. Specifically, when a sinusoidal function of frequency f1 is multiplied by another sinusoidal function of frequency f2 not equal to f1 and integrated over a time much longer than the period of the two functions, the result is zero. If instead f1 is equal to f2 and the two functions are in phase, the average value is equal to half of the product of the amplitudes.

In essence, a lock-in amplifier takes the input signal, multiplies it by the reference signal (either provided from the internal oscillator or an external source, and can be sinusoidal or square wave), and integrates it over a specified time, usually on the order of milliseconds to a few seconds. The resulting signal is a DC signal, where the contribution from any signal that is not at the same frequency as the reference signal is attenuated close to zero. The out-of-phase component of the signal that has the same frequency as the reference signal is also attenuated (because sine functions are orthogonal to the cosine functions of the same frequency), making a lock-in a phase-sensitive detector.

For a sine reference signal and an input waveform , the DC output signal  can be calculated for an analog lock-in amplifier as

where φ is a phase that can be set on the lock-in (set to zero by default).

If the averaging time T is large enough (e.g. much larger than the signal period) to suppress all unwanted parts like noise and the variations at twice the reference frequency, the output is

Many applications of the lock-in amplifier only require recovering the signal amplitude rather than relative phase to the reference signal. For a simple so called single-phase lock-in-amplifier the phase difference is adjusted (usually manually) to zero to get the full signal.

More advanced, so called two-phase lock-in-amplifiers have a second detector, doing the same calculation as before, but with an additional 90° phase shift. Thus one has two outputs:  is called the "in-phase" component, and  the "quadrature" component. These two quantities represent the signal as a vector relative to the lock-in reference oscillator.  By computing the magnitude (R) of the signal vector, the phase dependency is removed:

The phase can be calculated from

Digital lock-in amplifiers 
The majority of today's lock-in amplifiers are based on high-performance digital signal processing (DSP). Over the last 20 years, digital lock-in amplifiers have been replacing analog models across the entire frequency range, allowing users to perform measurements up to a frequency of 600 MHz. Initial problems of the first digital lock-in amplifiers, e.g. the presence of digital clock noise on the input connectors, could be completely eliminated by use of improved electronic components and better instrument design. Today's digital lock-in amplifiers outperform analog models in all relevant performance parameters, such as frequency range, input noise, stability and dynamic reserve. In addition to better performance, digital lock-in amplifiers can include multiple demodulators, which allows analyzing a signal with different filter settings or at multiple different frequencies simultaneously. Moreover, experimental data can be analyzed with additional tools such as an oscilloscope, FFT spectrum analyzers, boxcar averager or used to provide feedback by using internal PID controllers. Some models of the digital lock-in amplifiers are computer-controlled and feature a graphical user interface (can be a platform-independent browser user interface) and a choice of programming interfaces.

Signal measurement in noisy environments 

Signal recovery takes advantage of the fact that noise is often spread over a much wider range of frequencies than the signal. In the simplest case of white noise, even if the root mean square of noise is 103 times as large as the signal to be recovered, if the bandwidth of the measurement instrument can be reduced by a factor much greater than 106 around the signal frequency, then the equipment can be relatively insensitive to the noise. In a typical 100 MHz bandwidth (e.g. an oscilloscope), a bandpass filter with width much narrower than 100 Hz would accomplish this. The averaging time of the lock-in amplifier determines the bandwidth and allows very narrow filters, less than 1 Hz if needed. However, this comes at the price of a slow response to changes in the signal.

In summary, even when noise and signal are indistinguishable in the time domain, if the signal has a definite frequency band and there is no large noise peak within that band, noise and signal can be separated sufficiently in the frequency domain.

If the signal is either slowly varying or otherwise constant (essentially a DC signal), then 1/f noise typically overwhelms the signal. It may then be necessary to use external means to modulate the signal. For example, when detecting a small light signal against a bright background, the signal can be modulated either by a chopper wheel, acousto-optical modulator, photoelastic modulator at a large enough frequency so that 1/f noise drops off significantly, and the lock-in amplifier is referenced to the operating frequency of the modulator. In the case of an atomic-force microscope, to achieve nanometer and piconewton resolution, the cantilever position is modulated at a high frequency, to which the lock-in amplifier is again referenced.

When the lock-in technique is applied, care must be taken to calibrate the signal, because lock-in amplifiers generally detect only the root-mean-square signal of the operating frequency.

In the case of nonlinear systems, higher harmonics of the modulation frequency appear. A simple example is the light of a conventional light bulb being modulated at twice the line frequency. Some lock-in amplifiers also allow separate measurements of these higher harmonics.

Furthermore, the response width (effective bandwidth) of detected signal depends on the amplitude of the modulation. Generally, linewidth/modulation function has a monotonically increasing, non-linear behavior.

References

Publications

External links
 About LIAs from Stanford Research Systems. Application note detailing how lock-in amplifiers work.
 Lock-in amplifier tutorial from Bentham Instruments. Comprehensive tutorial about the why and how of lock-in amplifiers.
 Lock-in Technical Notes Range of Technical and Applications notes describing the design of digital and analog lock-ins, and guide to their specifications from SIGNAL RECOVERY.
 PCSC-Lock-in Tool for data acquisition on acoustic chopping frequency using a computer sound card.

Electronic test equipment
Electronic amplifiers
Laboratory equipment